The Gibson Les Paul Junior is a solid-body electric guitar introduced in 1954 as an affordable, entry-level Les Paul. It was first released with a single-cutaway body style; models with a double-cutaway body style were later introduced in 1958. The Junior continued through the first three years of the Les Paul/SG body redesign. The initial run was discontinued in 1963.

History
The goal for the Les Paul Junior was to have a high-quality guitar that was still affordable. This was achieved by stripping the Gibson Les Paul down to the basics: no binding, no carved top, one pickup, one volume knob and one tone knob. The Junior was equipped with one P-90 "dog-ear" pickup at the bridge, which was actually a stop tailpiece from the standard Les Paul, repurposed. It was originally released in sunburst in mid-1954.

In 1955, Gibson launched the Les Paul TV model, which was identical to the Junior except for the name and a fashionable contemporary "limed oak" style finish, later more accurately named "limed mahogany". This natural wood finish with white grain filler often aged into a natural wood or dull yellow appearance, and eventually evolved into the opaque mustard yellow, popularly called "TV yellow". The model was not, as a popular myth says, to avoid glare from old TV cameras, but a modern look and a name to promote The Les Paul & Mary Ford Show then on television. The double-cutaway model was introduced in 1958, nearly doubling sales of the line.

In the 1960s and 1970s the Les Paul Junior became very popular because of its simplicity and distinguishable tone when played through a high-gain amplifier. The P-90 pickup and simple bridge give the guitar a distinct crunch that was desired by rock and blues players of the time, including Leslie West of Mountain, Luther Grosvenor (a.k.a. Ariel Bender) of Spooky Tooth and Mott the Hoople, Johnny Thunders of The New York Dolls and The Heartbreakers, and Glenn Frey of The Eagles. A Les Paul Junior (with a Charlie Christian pickup added in the neck position) also became John Lennon's main guitar during his post-Beatles years. Martin Barre of Jethro Tull recorded the entire Aqualung album with a 1957 Les Paul Junior, including the extended guitar solo of the title track.

It is also used by Billie Joe Armstrong from the band Green Day.

Variations

The Les Paul Junior was originally introduced in 1954 as a single-cutaway model, with its double-cutaway counterpart arriving to the market in early 1958. Color schemes most commonly placed on Juniors were vintage sunburst, cherry red, and TV yellow. In 2012, two rare black models with tortoiseshell pickguard, from 1959 and 1960, were described in Vintage Guitar; the possibility was offered that black models were special-ordered for a specific store, or that the black finish was used to cover up blemishes in the wood. In 1961, the body style of the Junior was shifted, and after conflict between Gibson and Les Paul, these models were later renamed the "SG Junior".

The Les Paul Junior is still offered today in several different variations. Gibson offers U.S.-made Les Paul Juniors which has been given modern touches including a more slim-tapered neck. These particular Juniors have been seen in several different incarnations since the mid-1980s in both single- and double-cutaway. (see #Timeline) The Gibson Custom shop has also offered a period-correct Junior over the years through both its Historic and VOS branches. These models feature the more notorious large neck or "baseball bat" neck as it is often referred to among players.

Several artists have had Juniors produced in the Gibson product line including John Lennon, Mick Jones, Peter Frampton, and often included is the Bob Marley Les Paul Special. The Lennon model is unique for the single-coil, hexagon-shaped "Charlie Christian" pickup at the neck, a modification Lennon himself accepted when he had his actual Junior serviced in the 1970s, upon acquiring the guitar (the pickup name derives from the pickup installed on Christian's Gibson ES-150 guitar). Green Day's Billie Joe Armstrong and Gibson have released two signature Les Paul Juniors, the first is in three custom colors including Vintage Sunburst, Classic White, and Ebony, and is based on the actual '54-'57 Juniors. It also has some modern features requested by Armstrong, which include a slim tapered neck, as well as a specially designed "H-90" pickup which is said to be hum-canceling and it is overwound to handle more distortion. Armstrong's second signature model is a double-cutaway in TV Yellow which also includes an "H-90" pickup.  However, according to Armstrong's guitar tech, he does not use the H-90 in his guitars.  He uses a Seymour Duncan Antiquity P-90 pickup.

The Les Paul Special has a similar body shape, but is equipped with two P-90 pickups and Gibson's standard four-knob, three-way switch electronics.

Ace Frehley and Gibson created a unique model of this guitar: The Gibson Les Paul Junior Lighter. It is a variation of a Les Paul Junior with a DiMarzio Superdistortion pickup added by Ace. It contained light bulbs incorporated into sequences that turned on as a marquee, but at first there were so many lamps that gave off so much energy and heat which affected Ace, that they decided to reduce them. They installed 20 cells for rechargeable batteries "C", circuits and new lamps.

Leslie West declined an offer to have a signature model of the instrument produced because he did not want a signature guitar based on an already-existing instrument, even though the Les Paul Junior was his main instrument during his heyday in Mountain.

In 2015, Gibson announced the re-release of the Gibson Les Paul Junior into their 2015 USA range. They decided to release a newer version of the Gibson Les Paul Junior in 2018 with vintage specifications including a '50 neck profile.

Epiphone Les Paul Junior
Epiphone, a major guitar company purchased by Gibson in 1957, sells lower-cost Juniors which feature a bolt-on neck configuration as well as being outfitted with a single humbucking pickup rather than the traditional P-90. Epiphone has released limited edition models including the Collegiate Edition and the Epiphone Limited Edition '57 Les Paul Junior Reissue with P-100, which features a set neck, all-solid mahogany construction, and a P-100 humbucker. Epiphone Japan has also released Juniors (with the Gibson headstock) including the LPJ-70 and the Ltd edition Lacquer Series Jr (both in vintage sunburst and cherry). These Juniors were pretty much dead-on regarding the original 1954 Gibson specifications but they were manufactured for the Japanese market only and not for export.

Epiphone Invader 
Epiphone manufactured the Invader as part of a starter pack which was marketed mostly in mainland Europe. In essence, the Invader is an identical guitar to the Epiphone Junior, with a single generic humbucker and single volume and tone pots. Invaders were manufactured by the Samick organisation in Indonesia but have now been discontinued in light of the success and production of the Junior.

Invaders are strictly budget-end instruments and do tend to suffer from the not-unusual weakness of occasionally having poor tuning stability, but these instruments can still be regarded as very useful and playable instruments. They are light, versatile, and comfortable.

As with the Junior, the Invader is the Epiphone version of the Gibson Junior and can also be seen as having links with the Gibson Melody Maker.

Models
List of "Junior" models (original and reissue). For "Junior Special" models, Epiphone models, and Robot Guitar models, see Gibson Les Paul Special and #Variations, respectively.

Single cutaway

 1954–1958: 	Les Paul Junior (Single Cutaway)
 1956–1958: 	Les Paul Junior 3/4 (Single Cutaway)
 1954–1958: 	Les Paul TV (Single Cutaway)
reissues
 1986–1992: 	Les Paul Junior (Single Cutaway Reissue)
 2001–2002: 	Les Paul Junior (LPJ-)
variations
 2008–2012: 	Les Paul Junior Faded (LPJ)
 2011–2012: 	Les Paul Junior 2011 (Model LPJ)
 2015:   	Les Paul Junior 2015 (LPJR15)
 2018:          Les Paul Junior 2018
 2018:          Les Paul Junior 2018 Billie Joe Armstrong Signature (Humbucker loaded)
 2020:          Les Paul Junior 2020 Lukas Nelson ‘56 Limited Edition

Double cutaway

 1958–1961: 	Les Paul Junior (Double Cutaway)
 1958–1959: 	Les Paul TV (Double Cutaway)
 (1961–1963: 	Les Paul Junior (SG-style))
reissues
 1987–1989, 1995–1996:       	Les Paul Junior (Double Cutaway Reissue)
variations
 1990–1992: 	Les Paul Junior Hall of Fame Series (Double Cutaway Reissue, with P-100 humbuckers)

Timeline

See also
 List of Gibson players
 Gibson Melody Maker (1959-1971) - an entry level guitar model similar to Les Paul Junior but with thinner body.
 Gibson SG Junior    (1961-1971, 2011–present) - successor of Les Paul Junior with SG shape.
 Gibson Spirit       (1972-1985) - a guitar model similar to Les Paul Junior DC but with cutaway at 20th fret.

References

Bibliography

Further reading
 — search the text "SG Les Paul" to find the SG-shaped Les Pauls.

External links 
 Les Paul Junior at Gibson.com
Gibson Les Paul History

Les Paul Junior
Junior